Alıcqışlaq (also, Alıçqışlaq, Alychkyshlak, and Alydzhkyshlakh) is a village and municipality in the Khachmaz Rayon of Azerbaijan.  It has a population of 532.

References 

Populated places in Khachmaz District